Jason Westrol (born June 20, 1988) is an American professional basketball player who last played for the Limburg United of the Belgian Basketball League.

Raised in Brielle, New Jersey, Westrol attended Manasquan High School, where he was part of the team that won the Group II state championship during his sophomore year.

References

External links
Bentley Falcons bio
ReaGM profile
Eurobasket.com profile
Jason Westrol Highlights - Youtube.com video

1988 births
Living people
American expatriate basketball people in Belgium
American expatriate basketball people in France
American expatriate basketball people in Romania
American men's basketball players
Basketball players from New Jersey
Bentley Falcons men's basketball players
CSU Asesoft Ploiești players
Le Mans Sarthe Basket players
Leuven Bears players
Limburg United players
Manasquan High School alumni
People from Brielle, New Jersey
Point guards
Shooting guards
Sportspeople from Elizabeth, New Jersey
Sportspeople from Monmouth County, New Jersey